Sabinella troglodytes  is a species of small sea snail, a marine  gastropod  mollusk in the family Eulimidae. It is a parasitic snail found near the coast of Brazil which lives on the body of the slate pencil urchin Eucidaris tribuloides.

Distribution
Distribution of Sabinella troglodytes include near the coast of Brazil.

Description 
The maximum recorded shell length is 4.1 mm.

Habitat 
Minimum recorded depth is 1 m. Maximum recorded depth is 46 m.

Feeding habits

S. troglodytes feed and live on the spines of sea urchins. It lives on the body of the slate pencil urchin Eucidaris tribuloides. Unlike most of its gastropod relatives, S. troglodyte has lost its radula so they gain access to all that soft internal spine tissue of a sea urchin by secreting some kind of corrosive substance that eats through the tough walls of the spine. This parasitic snail is not content to simply just feed on the sea urchin, they also alter the urchin's spines to make it a more comfortable home. Sabinella troglodytes is one of many species of gall-forming snails that parasitize echinoderms. It is currently unknown how S. troglodytes alters the sea urchin's spines, but it could be due to some other components in the snail's saliva. In addition to a corrosive agent to erode the sea urchin's spine, it might also be spitting out growth factors that alter the tissue of the spine. In addition to being a cozy place to feed and hide from threats, these galls seem to be a bit of a love nest for S. troglodytes during the summer months.

References

External links

Eulimidae
Gastropods described in 1925